József Viola (10 June 1896 – 18 August 1949) also known as Giuseppe Viola was a Hungarian football player and coach, who played as a midfielder. He is most prominent for his time in Italy and his association with clubs such as Juventus. He also made one appearance for the Hungary national football team in 1920.

Honours

Club
Juventus
Serie A: 1925–26

References

Hungarian footballers
Hungary international footballers
Hungarian football managers
Hungarian expatriate footballers
Expatriate footballers in Italy
Serie A players
Serie B players
ACF Fiorentina players
Spezia Calcio players
Juventus F.C. players
Inter Milan players
Atalanta B.C. players
Juventus F.C. managers
Inter Milan managers
A.C. Milan managers
U.S. Livorno 1915 managers
S.P.A.L. managers
Bologna F.C. 1909 managers
S.S. Lazio managers
Serie A managers
Genoa C.F.C. managers
L.R. Vicenza managers
Italian people of Hungarian descent
Expatriate football managers in Italy
1896 births
1949 deaths
Association football midfielders